

CEDEP-1 is an experimental unmanned aerial vehicle (UAV) developed by the Project Development Center (CEDEP) of  the Peruvian Air Force.

Design and development
Funding is currently being provided through the Ministry of Defence and a grant from the National Council of Science and Technology (Concytec).  The aircraft is equipped with optical and infrared sensing technologies, with real-time communication to a ground station. In 2008, a prototype made a first test flight at Las Palmas Air Force Base.  Since then, a scale prototype has successfully made more than 20 flights in and around the resort of Chorrillos.  It has been reported that this aircraft has been used to support counter-terrorism operations in the Valley of Apurímac and Ene River (VRAE).

References

Notes

Unmanned military aircraft
Aircraft manufactured in Peru
Unmanned aerial vehicles of Peru